A  is a type of yōkai or Japanese monster.  They are characterized by their two mouths – a normal one located on her face and a second one on the back of the head beneath the hair. There, the woman's skull splits apart, forming lips, teeth and a tongue, creating an entirely functional second mouth.

In Japanese mythology and folklore, the futakuchi-onna belongs to the same class of stories as the rokurokubi, kuchisake-onna and the yama-uba, women afflicted with a curse or supernatural disease that transforms them into yōkai.  The supernatural nature of the women in these stories is usually concealed until the last minute, when the true self is revealed.

Origins of the second mouth
The origin of a futakuchi-onna's second mouth is often linked to how little a woman eats. In many stories, the soon-to-be futakuchi-onna is a wife of a miser and rarely eats. To counteract this, a second mouth mysteriously appears on the back of the woman's head. The second mouth often mumbles spiteful and threatening things to the woman and demands food. If it is not fed, it can screech obscenely and cause the woman tremendous pain. Eventually, the woman's hair begins to move like a pair of serpents, allowing the mouth to help itself to the woman's meals. While no food passes through her normal lips, the mouth in the back of her head consumes twice than the other one would. In another story, the extra mouth is formed when a stingy woman was accidentally hit in the head by her husband's axe while he was chopping wood, and the wound never heals. Other stories have the woman as a mother who lets her stepchild die of starvation while keeping her own offspring well fed; presumably, the spirit of the neglected child lodges itself in the stepmother's or the surviving daughter's body to exact revenge.

Prototypical story
This is the most famous and prototypical story of a futakuchi-onna:

In a small village there lived a stingy miser who, because he could not bear the expense of paying for food for a wife, lived entirely by himself.

One day he met a woman who was full of beauty; with every villager admiring her looks. Although she did not eat anything, the miser immediately took the woman as his wife. Because she never ate a thing, and was still a hard worker, the old miser was extraordinarily thrilled with her, but on the other hand he began to wonder why was his storage of rice was steadily decreasing.

One day the man pretended to leave for work, but instead stayed behind to spy on his new wife. To his horror, he saw his wife's hair part on the back of her head, her skull split wide open revealing a gaping mouth. She unbound her hair, which reached out like tentacles to grab the rice and shove it into the hungry mouth. He immediately ran away of fear, after a horror moment about his wife having a mouth in the back of her head.

In popular culture

 Keiko Yukitomo plays a friendly futakuchi-onna in Yokai Monsters: Spook Warfare (1968). At one point she reassures people that she and her companion, a Kasa-obake, "are not evil monsters" and are there to help, and is true to her word.  At one point in the film she pretends to be a courtesan to get through a palace gate, then frightens away would-be clients with her second face.
 In the manga Gantz a creature that has the characteristics of both the futakuchi-onna and the rokurokubi (i.e. second mouth on the back of the head and the ability to elongate the neck) is seen in later chapters of the series, albeit briefly. It is not stated if this is another variation of the creature or a way to feature both at the same time.
 The long running anime series GeGeGe no Kitaro often features futakuchi-onna as an antagonist to Kitaro. Her skin is a pale white with raven black hair which can form snake-like ropes that stretch out and snare victims, often to pull them towards her horrifically large mouth on the back of her head which has sharp teeth. She is also known to work with other yōkai antagonists Kamaitachi and Tantanbō.
 The 2005 movie The Great Yokai War briefly features a futakuchi-onna.
 In the video game The Last Blade, the character Akari Ichijou uses various attacks that involve yōkai. One of them is a special move that summons "a hundred yōkai" that parade across the screen in a procession. A futakuchi-onna is featured in this procession.
 Samurai Sentai Shinkenger and Power Rangers Samurai villain Tayu Usukawa is themed after the futakuchi-onna.
 In Shuriken Sentai Ninninger, one of the "Monster of the Fortnight" Youkai the Ninningers fought was a futakuchi-onna.
 The television horror anthology series Masters of Horror featured a creature similar to a futakuchi-onna as a main character in the episode Imprint.
 The Pokémon Mawile is based on the futakuchi-onna. According to some of its Pokédex entries, its second mouth was created as a result of transformation of its steel horns.
 The comic Eerie Cuties featured a futakuchi-onna as a history teacher.
 The adult-oriented strategy game Sengoku Rance features a female ninja character named "Orime" who is based on the futakuchi-onna.
 In the video game The Secret World, the Futakuchi-onna is a rare enemy located in Tokyo.
 In Miss Peregrine's Home for Peculiar Children and its film adaption, the character named Claire Densmore is inspired by the futakuchi-onna where she has a mouth with sharp teeth that is covered by her curly hair which she mostly eats with.
 In the video game Skullgirls, the location of the parasite Samson on Filia gives her the appearance of a futakuchi-onna.
 In the mobile game Onmyoji, Futakuchi-onna is a shikigami with two huge arms on her head that resembles pigtails.
In the upcoming videogame Mamono (a Pokémon-inspired RPG game), the futakuchi-onna is one of the trainable monster girls.
In the game Tee K.O. from The Jackbox Party Pack 3, there is a featured playable character that is a futakuchi-onna.
The virtual YouTuber Futakuchi Mana is a futakuchi-onna.
 The popular Roblox horror game The Mimic contains a futakuchi-onna named Rin (Book II, Jealousy, Chapter I) who the player(s) must feed poisoned rats to. In this game, however, the backstory consists of two poverty-struck sisters.
 In the manga Chainsaw Man, Pingsti (a member of Quanxi's harem) is seemingly based on the futakuchi-onna. Her hair is shaped as a ponytail with a face that turns into a monocle to identify the devil(s) a person is contracted with.

See also
Craniopagus parasiticus and Diprosopus – scientific explanation
Edward Mordrake
Obake
Shigeru Mizuki
Tomie Kawakami

References

Female legendary creatures
Yōkai
Mythological monsters
Monsters